John Pope is the name of:

Politicians
John Pope (fl. 1384–1397), MP for Gloucester
John Pope (fl.1419–1421), MP for Reigate
John Pope (Kentucky politician) (1770–1845), U.S. politician, senator for Kentucky, and governor of Arkansas Territory
John Pope (alderman) (born c. 1972), Chicago alderman from the 10th ward
John Pope (planter) (1794–1865), Alabama politician and Tennessee planter
John Henry Pope (1824–1889), Canadian farmer, lumberman, railway entrepreneur, and politician

Military
John Pope (travel writer) (died 1795), U.S. soldier, traveler, and author
John Pope (naval officer) (1798–1876), U.S. naval officer in the American Civil War
John Pope (military officer) (1822–1892), U.S. soldier and Union general in the Civil War

Others
John Pope (artist) (1821–1880), artist in Boston, Massachusetts, and New York in the 19th century
John Pope (fictional astronaut), fictional character in James A. Michener's 1985 novel Space
John Pope (rower), English rower
John Pope (priest) (died 1558), English priest
John Pope (1856–1896), companion of American businessman Lewis Ginter
John Alexander Pope (1906–1982), director of the Freer Gallery of Art in Washington, DC
John Edwin Pope (1928–2017), American sportswriter
John Russell Pope (1874–1937), American architect
John Pope, List of Falling Skies characters

See also
Pope John (disambiguation)